Pickett County is a county located in the U.S. state of Tennessee. As of the 2020 census, the population was 5,001, making it the least populous county in Tennessee. Its county seat is Byrdstown. The city of Byrdstown and the Kentucky town of Albany,  to the northeast, are positioned between two Army Corps of Engineers lakes: Dale Hollow Lake, mainly in Tennessee, and Lake Cumberland, in Kentucky.  The area is known as "Twin Lakes" and Byrdstown is noted as "The Gateway To Dale Hollow Lake".  Every year thousands of people vacation at the many resorts situated along the lakes.

History

Pickett County was created in 1879 from sections of Overton and Fentress counties.  It was named for Howell Lester Pickett (1847 - 1914), a member of the state legislature representing Wilson County who had been instrumental in the county's formation. Nobel Peace Prize winner Cordell Hull had been born in one of the parcels of land set aside to create the new county.  Hull would be honored for his role in organizing the World War II diplomatic alliance that became the United Nations.

Geography
It is the fourth-smallest county in Tennessee by land area and third-smallest by total area. The eastern part of the county, much of which is part of Pickett State Forest, lies atop the Cumberland Plateau, while the western, more populated half is located on the Highland Rim. The Wolf River and the Obey River, the lower parts of which are part of Dale Hollow Lake, pass through the county. The rivers converge just west of the county's border with Clay County.

Streams in the far eastern section of the county are part of the watershed of the Big South Fork of the Cumberland River.

Adjacent counties
Wayne County, Kentucky (northeast/EST Border)
Scott County (east/EST Border)
Fentress County (southeast)
Overton County (southwest)
Clay County (west)
Clinton County, Kentucky (north)

National protected area
 Big South Fork National River and Recreation Area (very small part)

State protected areas
 Cordell Hull Birthplace State Park
 Honey Creek State Natural Area
 Pickett State Forest (part)
 Pickett CCC Memorial State Park
 Twin Arches State Natural Area (part)

Highways

Demographics

2020 census

As of the 2020 United States census, there were 5,001 people, 2,281 households, and 1,600 families residing in the county.

2000 census
As of the census of 2000, there were 4,945 people, 2,091 households, and 1,461 families residing in the county.  The population density was 30 people per square mile (12/km2).  There were 2,956 housing units at an average density of 18 per square mile (7/km2).  The racial makeup of the county was 99.15% White, 0.10% Black or African American, 0.16% Native American, 0.04% Asian, 0.10% from other races, and 0.44% from two or more races.  0.83% of the population were Hispanic or Latino of any race.

There were 2,091 households, out of which 27.40% had children under the age of 18 living with them, 58.30% were married couples living together, 7.80% had a female householder with no husband present, and 30.10% were non-families. 27.20% of all households were made up of individuals, and 12.90% had someone living alone who was 65 years of age or older.  The average household size was 2.33 and the average family size was 2.83.

In the county, the population was spread out, with 21.40% under the age of 18, 8.60% from 18 to 24, 24.70% from 25 to 44, 27.70% from 45 to 64, and 17.80% who were 65 years of age or older.  The median age was 42 years. For every 100 females there were 96.80 males.  For every 100 females age 18 and over, there were 94.20 males.

The median income for a household in the county was $24,673, and the median income for a family was $31,355. Males had a median income of $22,367 versus $17,173 for females. The per capita income for the county was $14,681.  About 12.00% of families and 15.60% of the population were below the poverty line, including 19.40% of those under age 18 and 20.00% of those age 65 or over.

Education
Pickett County High School - High school
Pickett County K-8 - Elementary school/Junior high school

Communities

Town
Byrdstown (county seat)

Unincorporated communities
 Boom
Cedar Grove
Love Lady
Midway
Moodyville
Static

Ghost town
Olympus

Politics
Along with Macon County and Fentress County, Pickett County constitutes an outlier in Tennessee politics as it is a historically Republican county in a region (Middle Tennessee) that was overwhelmingly Democratic up until recent years. Since its founding, Republicans have carried the county in every presidential election, with the only exceptions being Franklin D. Roosevelt in 1932, and Woodrow Wilson and Bill Clinton in the split 1912 and 1992 elections, respectively.

See also
National Register of Historic Places listings in Pickett County, Tennessee

References

External links

 Pickett County Government — DaleHollow.com
 Pickett County, TNGenWeb - free genealogy resources for the county

 
1879 establishments in Tennessee
Populated places established in 1879
Counties of Appalachia
Middle Tennessee